Barbara Malcotti (born 19 February 2000) is an Italian professional racing cyclist, who currently rides for UCI Women's Continental Team .

References

External links
 

2000 births
Living people
Italian female cyclists
Sportspeople from Trentino
Cyclists from Trentino-Alto Adige/Südtirol